"" (French: "it'll be fine") is an emblematic song of the French Revolution, first heard in May 1790. It underwent several changes in wording, all of which used the title words as part of the refrain.

Original version
The author of the original words "" was a former soldier by the name of Ladré who made a living as a street singer.

The music is a popular contredanse air called "Le carillon national", and was composed by Bécourt, a violinist (according to other sources: side drum player) of the théâtre Beaujolais. Queen Marie Antoinette herself is said to have often played the music on her harpsichord.

The title and theme of the refrain were inspired by Benjamin Franklin, in France as a representative of the Continental Congress, who was very popular among the French people. When asked about the American Revolutionary War, he would reportedly reply, in somewhat broken French, "" ("It'll be fine, it'll be fine").

The song first became popular as a worksong during the preparation for the Fête de la Fédération of 1790 and eventually became recognized as an unofficial anthem of revolutionaries.

Sans-culotte version 
At later stages of the revolution, many sans-culottes used several much more aggressive stanzas, calling for the lynching of the nobility and the clergy.

Ah! ça ira, ça ira, ça ira
les aristocrates à la lanterne!
Ah! ça ira, ça ira, ça ira
les aristocrates on les pendra!

Si on n' les pend pas
On les rompra
Si on n' les rompt pas
On les brûlera.
Ah! ça ira, ça ira, ça ira
les aristocrates à la lanterne!
Ah! ça ira, ça ira, ça ira
les aristocrates on les pendra!

Nous n'avions plus ni nobles, ni prêtres,
Ah ! ça ira, ça ira, ça ira,
L'égalité partout régnera.
L'esclave autrichien le suivra,
Ah ! ça ira, ça ira, ça ira,
Et leur infernale clique
Au diable s'envolera.
Ah! ça ira, ça ira, ça ira
les aristocrates à la lanterne!
Ah! ça ira, ça ira, ça ira
les aristocrates on les pendra!
Et quand on les aura tous pendus
On leur fichera la pelle au cul.
Ah! It'll be fine, It'll be fine, It'll be fine
aristocrats to the lamp-post
Ah! It'll be fine, It'll be fine, It'll be fine
the aristocrats, we'll hang them!

If we don't hang them
We'll break them
If we don't break them
We'll burn them
Ah! It'll be fine, It'll be fine, It'll be fine
aristocrats to the lamp-post
Ah! It'll be fine, It'll be fine, It'll be fine
the aristocrats, we'll hang them!

We shall have no more nobles nor priests
Ah! It'll be fine, It'll be fine, It'll be fine
Equality will reign everywhere
The Austrian slave shall follow him
Ah! It'll be fine, It'll be fine, It'll be fine
And their infernal clique
Shall go to hell
Ah! It'll be fine, It'll be fine, It'll be fine
aristocrats to the lamp-post
Ah! It'll be fine, It'll be fine, It'll be fine
the aristocrats, we'll hang them!
And when we'll have hung them all
We'll stick a shovel up their arse.

Post-revolutionary use 
The song survived past the Reign of Terror, and, during the Directory, it became mandatory to sing it before shows. It was forbidden under the Consulate.

The ship of the line La Couronne was renamed Ça Ira in 1792 in reference to this song.

At the 1793 Battle of Famars, the 14th Regiment of Foot, The West Yorkshire Regiment, attacked the French to the music of "Ça ira" (the colonel commenting that he would "beat the French to their own damned tune"). The regiment was later awarded the tune as a battle honour and regimental quick march. It has since been adopted by the Yorkshire Regiment.

Friedrich Witt cited this motif in the Finale of his Symphony no. 16 in A major. Although the year of its completion is unknown, it's clear that it was written in the 1790s.

Carl Schurz, in volume 1, chapter 14, of his Reminiscences, reported from exile in England that upon Napoleon III's coup d'état of 2 December 1851, "Our French friends shouted and shrieked and gesticulated and hurled opprobrious names at Louis Napoleon and cursed his helpers, and danced the Carmagnole and sang 'Ça ira.'"

Russian composer Nikolai Myaskovsky used both Ça Ira and La Carmagnole in the finale of his Symphony No. 6 in E-flat minor Revolutionary

Modern adaptations 
An alternative "sans-culotte"-like version was sung by Édith Piaf for the soundtrack of the film Royal Affairs in Versailles (Si Versailles m'était conté) by Sacha Guitry.

The song is featured in the 1999 television series The Scarlet Pimpernel, starring Richard E. Grant. There the lyrics are sung in English as follows:
Ah ça ira, ça ira, ça ira
Over in France there's a revolution
Ah ça ira, ça ira, ça ira
Watch what you say or you'll lose your head
Ah ça ira, ça ira, ça ira
Pass some time, see an execution! 
Ah ça ira, ça ira, ça ira
Une deux trois and you fall down dead
Ah ça ira, ça ira, ça ira
Hear the tale of Marie Antoinette-a!
Ah ça ira, ça ira, ça ira
A bloodier sight you have never seen!

In an opening scene of the novel What Is To Be Done? by Nikolay Chernyshevsky, the protagonist Vera Pavlovna is shown singing a song with ça ira in the refrain, accompanied by a paraphrase outlining the struggle for a socialist utopian future. The 1875 French translator "A.T." produced a four-stanza version on the basis of the paraphrase, which was reproduced in full by Benjamin Tucker in his translation.

See also
"La Marseillaise"

References

External links 
 "Ça ira" sung by Edith Piaf, 1954 (mp3)
 German translation of "Ça ira" by Gerd Semmer sung by Dieter Süverkrüp, 1962 - same as orchestrated version with explanation, 1969
 "Ça ira", original version (mp3)
 "Ça ira" from the Modern History Sourcebook website of Fordham University, includes translation and discussion of lyrics (song title translated as "We Will Win!")
 
 

Songs of the French Revolution
French military marches
1790 songs
Songwriter unknown